Abduraheem Mohammed (Arabic:عبد الرحيم محمد) (born 12 June 1994) is an Emirati footballer. He currently plays as a midfielder .

External links

References

Emirati footballers
1994 births
Living people
Khor Fakkan Sports Club players
Al Dhafra FC players
Al Shabab Al Arabi Club Dubai players
Fujairah FC players
Place of birth missing (living people)
Al-Ittihad Kalba SC players
UAE First Division League players
UAE Pro League players
Association football midfielders